Zaborye is a rural locality (a village) in Nyuksenskoye Rural Settlement, Nyuksensky District, Vologda Oblast, Russia. The population was 15 as of 2002.

Geography 
Zaborye is located 14 km northwest of Nyuksenitsa (the district's administrative centre) by road. Lesyutino is the nearest rural locality.

References 

Rural localities in Nyuksensky District